Biagio "Billy" Ciotto (25 December 1929 – 20 March 2021) was an American politician. Ciotto, a Democrat, served as a state senator from Connecticut from 1995 to 2007. Before retiring in 2006, Ciotto had served as Majority Caucus Chair in the Senate.  Prior to holding elective office, Ciotto worked for the Connecticut Department of Motor Vehicles, retiring as a Deputy Commissioner in 1989.

References

External links
Official website

1929 births
2021 deaths
Democratic Party Connecticut state senators
Politicians from Hartford, Connecticut
People from Wethersfield, Connecticut
20th-century American politicians
21st-century American politicians